Diana Moukalled is a Lebanese journalist and documentary producer/director with 25 years of experience in covering hot zones and writing and producing stories in the Middle East. Her war coverages included Lebanon, Afghanistan (2001), Iraq (2003), and Yemen (2015). She has more than 50 hours of documentaries that tackled socio-political issues in the region and around the world;Women, minorities, human interest stories and many other topics.

Career 

She started her career in 1993 as a general news reporter at Future TV covering news, political and social issues.
In 1999 she started working on documentary series called ”Bil Ain Almujaradah” that covered hot political and social topics in conflict zones.  The documentaries shed lights on issues that were rarely raised by Arab media especially issues related to women, minorities and democracy.

In 2010 she became head of Future TV website and social media pages.

In 2017, Diana and along with 2 other co-founders, launched Daraj Media; an independent media platform that addresses controversial issues that are underreported in the Arab region. Daraj was the only Arab media platform to be part of Paradise Papers by ICIJ.

Diana Moukalled has also been regular contributor to several Lebanese and pan-Arab publications.

References

Lebanese women journalists
Al Arabiya people
1969 births
Living people